Abel & Imray LLP (or Abel + Imray) is a United Kingdom firm of patent and trade mark attorneys, with offices in London, Bath, Cardiff, and Delft.  The original partnership was founded on 12 June 1871 (+/- 5 weeks) by Charles Denton Abel and John Imray, which makes it one of the oldest patent and trade mark attorney firms in the UK still trading under its original name.  John Imray and Charles Abel were amongst those individuals who set up CIPA (the Chartered Institute of Patent Attorneys) in 1891 and were, respectively, the second and sixth Presidents of CIPA.  The firm celebrated its 150 year anniversary in 2021.

References

External links
 Abel & Imray website

Law firms established in 1871
Law firms based in London
Patent law firms
Intellectual property law firms